Jamali Kamali Mosque and Tomb, located in the Archaeological Village complex in Mehrauli, Delhi, India, comprise two monuments adjacent to each other; one is the mosque and the other is the tomb of Jamali and Kamali. Their names are tagged together as "Jamali Kamali" for the mosque as well as the tomb since they are buried adjacent to each other. The mosque and the tomb were constructed in 1528-1529, and Jamali was buried in the tomb after his death in 1535.

Location
Mehrauli urban village where the monument is located is approachable from all parts of Delhi by well laid out roads and transport system. Visitors are free to visit the monument on all week days. The nearest metro station is Qutab Minar, which is within walking distance from the mosque.

The practice of Friday prayers is barred in such monuments classified by the body under the category of "non-living heritage structures".

History
"Jamali" was the alias given to Shaikh Fazlu'llah, also known as Shaikh Jamali Kamboh or Jalal Khan, a renowned Sufi saint who lived during Lodi Dynasty and the Mughal Dynasty, a period from the rule of Sikander Lodi to that of Babur and Humayun.

The name "Jamali" is Urdu, though originates from "Jamal" which means "beauty". Jamali was a popular poet who traveled widely around Asia and the Middle East. He became court poet during Lodi Dynasty rule and continued to enjoy the patronage of the Mughal rulers, Babur and his son Humayun.  His poetry mirrored Persian mysticism of the times. His two popular works are The Sun and Moon and The Spiritual Journey of the Mystics. It is said that his tomb was completed during Humayun's rule.

Kamali was an unknown person who was Jamali's disciple and his lover, according to the oral stories and traditions. It is noted that even though they were both males, as signified by a symbolic pen box on each of their graves, their graves are placed in a manner that implies that they were lovers.

Architecture

Mosque

The Jamali Kamali mosque, positioned in an enclosed garden area, built first during the years 1528-29, has a southern entry. It is built in red sandstone with marble embellishments. It is claimed to be a forerunner in the design of Mughal mosque architecture in India. The prayer hall, fronted by a large courtyard, has five arches with the central arch only having a dome. The size of arches increases towards the central arch, which is the largest of the five arches embellished with beautiful ornamentation. The spandrels of the arch are decorated with medallions and ornamentation. Fluted pilasters exquisitely decorate the central arch. The prayer wall on the west has niches with mihrab. The niches and walls are decorated with a few Koranic inscriptions. A porch around the mosque provides access to the two storied mosque and the four corners are adorned by octagonal towers. The rear end of the mosque has been provided with oriel windows, apart from a small window on the central arch.

Tomb
The tomb of Jamali-Kamali is a decorated  square structure with a flat roof, located adjacent to the mosque on its northern side. Inside the chamber, the flat ceiling is plastered and ornately decorated. It is painted in red and blue with some Koranic inscriptions, and the walls are adorned with inlaid coloured tiles inscribed with Jamali's poems. The decorations in the tomb have been described as giving the impression of "stepping into a jewel box". In the Jamali Kamali Mosque and Tomb the tomb chamber has two marble graves: one of Jamali, the saint poet and the other of Kamali.  The reason for the Kamali name could probably be that it rhymes well with Jamali.

Conservation
The monument is well maintained and provides a very serene atmosphere. Conservation of the monuments has been undertaken by the Archaeological Survey of India (ASI). It is one of the 172 monuments under the jurisdiction of the Delhi Archaeological circle, of ASI, identified for restoration. An amount of Rs. 1.5 million (US$30,000) has been proposed for this purpose.

Gallery

See also 
 Adham Khan's Tomb (Hindi: आधम खान का मकबरा, Urdu: ادھم خان کا مزار‎, Bangla: আধম খানের সমাধি) is the 16th-century tomb of Adham Khan, a general of the Mughal Emperor Akbar.

 Malcha Mahal, also known as Wilayat Mahal, is a Tughlak era hunting lodge in the Chanakyapuri area of New Delhi, India.

References

External links

 
 
 
 
 
 

Mosques in Delhi
Mausoleums in Delhi
Mughal tombs
Sufi mosques
Mehrauli
Religious buildings and structures completed in 1529
1529 establishments in India
Reportedly haunted locations in India
Sandstone buildings in India
Monuments of National Importance in Delhi